Anilbhai Joshiyara (24 April 1952 – 14 March 2022) was an Indian politician and surgeon from Gujarat.

Biography
He was elected to the Gujarat Legislative Assembly from Bhiloda in the 1995 Gujarat Legislative Assembly election as a member of Bharatiya Janata Party. He was sworn as Cabinet Minister for Health & Family Welfare of Gujarat in 1996. 

He was serving as a Member of Legislative Assembly from Bhiloda constituency in the Aravalli district, Gujarat for its 14th Legislative assembly representing Indian National Congress.

Joshiyara died from post-COVID-19 complications in Chennai on 14 March 2022, at the age of 69.

Political highlights

References 

1953 births
2022 deaths
Bharatiya Janata Party politicians from Gujarat
Indian National Congress politicians
Gujarat MLAs 1995–1998
Gujarat MLAs 2002–2007
Gujarat MLAs 2007–2012
Gujarat MLAs 2012–2017
Gujarat MLAs 2017–2022
Gujarat politicians
Deaths from the COVID-19 pandemic in India
Indian medical doctors
Indian National Congress politicians from Gujarat